Connor Hunte (born 12 September 1996) is an English footballer who is currently a free agent.

Career
Hunte was a member of Chelsea's academy and signed a scholarship with the club in January 2013, but was released seven months later. After having spent a period training with Wolverhampton Wanderers, he signed a contract with the Championship side in summer 2014.

He made his professional debut on 8 March 2016 as a substitute in a 2–1 victory against Bristol City. The following month he made his second and final appearance for the club when he came on as a substitute against Blackburn Rovers.

Hunte was loaned out to League Two club Stevenage at the start of the following season, where he made a total of six appearances, scoring once, before returning to Molineux. It was announced on 13 January 2017 that Hunte's contract with Wolves had been terminated by mutual consent.

On 10 August 2017, he signed for Isthmian League South Division club Greenwich Borough.

On 20 May 2018, Hunte signed for National League South club Billericay Town. Hunte was loaned out to Dulwich Hamlet on 22 March 2019 for the rest of the season. The deal was made permanent on 14 June 2019.

He joined Worthing on loan in February 2020.

References

External links

1996 births
Living people
English footballers
Wolverhampton Wanderers F.C. players
Stevenage F.C. players
Greenwich Borough F.C. players
Kingstonian F.C. players
Billericay Town F.C. players
Dulwich Hamlet F.C. players
English Football League players
Isthmian League players
Sportspeople from Surrey
Association football wingers
Footballers from Surrey
Worthing F.C. players